Barnong Station is a pastoral lease that operates as a sheep station in Western Australia. 

The station is an amalgamation of a number of smaller leases that were established in the 1870s. From 1872 Michael Morrissey had commenced acquiring several of the small leases, combining them into one property that became Barnong.

In 1886 a lease known as Meru and Barnong was advertised for sale.

The heritage listed homestead was constructed in the 1890s; the complex consists of the main house, the kitchen and dining rooms, staff quarters and shearing shed. The original house has two rooms with pug walls that have concrete render on the outside to window sill height. The new part of the house is built from stone that was quarried a short distance away.

Wainwright and Company held the lease to Barnong, Gabyon and Pindathirna Stations in 1898 when the area had a good year's rain with pools filled to overflowing and good feed available to stock.

In 2000 Judy Mitchell published the book The First Hundred Years: The Mitchell Family on Barnong Station, detailing the story of the family's time at Barnong.

See also
List of ranches and stations
List of pastoral leases in Western Australia

References

Pastoral leases in Western Australia
Stations (Australian agriculture)
Homesteads in Western Australia
Shire of Yalgoo